Cuscatlán is a department of El Salvador, located in the center of the country. It is inhabited by over 252,000 people. Cuscatlán or Cuzcatlán was the name the original inhabitants of the Western part of the country gave to most of the territory that is now El Salvador. In their language it means "land of precious jewels". It was created on 22 May 1835. Suchitoto was the first capital of the department but on 12 November 1861, Cojutepeque was made the capital. It is known in producing fruits, tobacco, sugar cane, and coffee among other items. The department is famous for its chorizos from the city of Cojutepeque.

Municipalities
 Candelaria
 Cojutepeque
 El Carmen
 El Rosario
 Monte San Juan
 Oratorio de Concepción
 San Bartolomé Perulapía
 San Cristóbal
 San José Guayabal
 San Pedro Perulapán
 San Rafael Cedros
 San Ramón
 Santa Cruz Analquito
 Santa Cruz Michapa
 Suchitoto
 Tenancingo

References
El Salvador at GeoHive

 
Departments of El Salvador
States and territories established in 1835
1835 establishments in El Salvador